Lucia Quinciani (c. 1566, fl. 1611) was an Italian composer. She is the earliest known published female composer of monody. She is known only by one composition, a setting of "Udite lagrimosi spirti d’Averno, udite", from Giovanni Battista Guarini's Il pastor fido, found in Marcantonio Negri's Affetti amorosi  second volume (1611), in which Negri refers to Quinciani as his student. She may have worked in Venice or Verona.

References

External links
 "Udite lagrimosi spirti d’Averno, udite" on IMSLP

1560s births
17th-century deaths
Italian women classical composers
Renaissance composers
Italian Baroque composers
17th-century Italian composers
17th-century women composers